The Childers Reforms of 1881 reorganised the infantry regiments of the British Army. The reforms were done by Secretary of State for War Hugh Childers during 1881, and were a continuation of the earlier Cardwell Reforms.

The reorganisation was effected by General Order 41/1881, issued on 1 May 1881, amended by G.O. 70/1881 dated 1 July, which created a network of multi-battalion regiments. In England, Wales and Scotland, each regiment was to have two regular or "line" battalions and two militia battalions. In Ireland, there were to be two line and three militia battalions. This was done by renaming the numbered regiments of foot and county militia regiments. In addition, the various corps of county rifle volunteers were to be designated as volunteer battalions. Each of these regiments was associated by headquarters location and territorial name to its local "Regimental District". The reforms became effective on 1 July.

From 1881, regimental seniority numbers were officially abolished and battalions came to be known by their number within the regiment and the regimental district name. Unofficially, the regiments were still referred to by their numbers by their officers and men, as tradition, and several regiments, such as "the Buffs" (the Royal East Kent Regiment), the Cameron Highlanders, and "the Black Watch", lobbied to keep their distinct names as part of their battalion titles.

In practice, it was not always possible to apply the scheme strictly: the Cameron Highlanders initially had only one regular battalion, while several regiments had more or fewer militia regiments than specified by the initial scheme. In addition, the King's Royal Rifle Corps and the Rifle Brigade (Prince Consort's Own) had no local regimental districts, and their affiliated militia and volunteer battalions were selected not on a territorial basis, but due to their "rifle" traditions. This structure lasted until 1948, when every regiment of line infantry had its regular battalions decreased to one, with only the three original Guards Division regiments retaining two regular battalions.

Also in 1881, short service was increased to seven years with the colours, and five with the reserve, of the twelve-year enlistment period that the Cardwell Reforms had introduced. He also introduced the ability for time-served soldiers to extend service in the reserve by four years, albeit classed as the second division, or Section D, of the First Class Army Reserve.

Standardisation of uniforms and colours
For reasons of economy and efficiency, an attempt was made to have the facings of uniforms standardised: Royal regiments would have dark blue facings, English and Welsh regiments would have white facings, Irish regiments would wear green facings (in effect only the Connaught Rangers as all other Irish Regiments were 'Royal Regiments'), and Scottish regiments would have yellow facings. Officers' uniforms had lace in distinctive national patterns: rose pattern for England and Wales, thistle for Scotland and shamrock for Ireland. In the case of regular battalions, the lace was gold, while that of the militia battalions was silver. There were also attempts to assimilate regimental insignia and remove "tribal" uniform distinctions. This was less successful, as regimental tribalism and tradition caused much criticism. Two regiments that displayed a strong reaction were the 75th and the 92nd that were grudgingly joined together to become the Gordon Highlanders. The 75th went so far as to commission a marble monument to themselves in Malta where they were based at the time. They had spent so long away from Scotland that they were effectively an English unit that had to relearn how to wear kilts. The 92nd, though they lost much less identity in the amalgamation, staged a mock funeral procession to themselves, complete with a full-size coffin with the number '92' on it.

During 1890, The Buffs succeeded in being allowed to resume the wearing of buff facings, initially at regimental expense and design. Within a few years, a number of other regiments had replaced white facings with traditional colours. After 1935, the ruling on blue facings for royal regiments effectively lapsed. That year, in celebration of his silver jubilee, King George V designated three regiments as royal. In each case, they were "permitted to retain their present facings". During 1939, the Royal Inniskilling Fusiliers, who had worn blue facings since 1881, were issued buff regimental colours "by request and gracious permission". In 1946, three more infantry regiments were designated as "royal" for services during World War II. Of these, only the Royal Lincolnshire Regiment replaced its (white) facings with blue.

Regiments created

* Berwickshire, Dumfriesshire, Roxburghshire and Selkirkshire were transferred to the regimental district of the King's Own Scottish Borderers district 1887.

† Huntingdonshire was originally included in the regimental district of the Suffolk Regiment. There were no volunteer units recruited in the county from 1889 until 1900, when the 4th (Huntingdonshire) Volunteer Battalion, The Bedfordshire Regiment was formed. In 1908, it became part of the 5th Battalion of the Bedfords. In 1914, the Huntingdonshire companies were transferred to a newly formed Huntingdonshire Cyclist Battalion, affiliated to The Northamptonshire Regiment. The successors to the cyclist unit continued to be part of the Northamptons.

‡ It was originally proposed to disband the Royal Irish Fusiliers during 1922. However, the 2nd battalion of that regiment and of the Royal Inniskilling Fusiliers were disbanded instead. During 1924, the two regiments formed a single "corps" sharing a depot and regimental district consisting of Counties Armagh, Fermanagh, Londonderry and Tyrone. In 1937, the regiments were again separated, with each forming a second battalion the next year.

Later changes

Between 1897 and 1900, the regular army was increased in size in response to a number of conflicts, especially the Second Boer War. The Cameron Highlanders raised a second battalion, while third and fourth regular battalions were added to the Northumberland Fusiliers, Warwickshire Regiment, Royal Fusiliers, King's (Liverpool Regiment), Lancashire Fusiliers, Worcestershire Regiment, Middlesex Regiment and the Manchester Regiment. The recruiting areas of each of these regiments included parts of large conurbations.

The Territorial and Reserve Forces Act 1907 reformed the reserve forces during 1908. A number of militia battalions were disbanded with the remainder being transferred to a new Special Reserve. At the same time, the volunteer battalions became part of the new Territorial Force, and were redesignated as numbered battalions of the regiments.

The army was expanded for the duration of the First World War, with the territorial battalions being duplicated and numerous war-time service battalions being formed.

During 1921-22, the system was somewhat changed: the special reserve battalions were reorganized and a number of Irish regiments were disbanded on the creation of the Irish Free State. All remaining regiments were reduced to two regular battalions.

During the Second World War, regiments were again expanded, although not to the same extent as for the previous conflict.

After the independence of India during 1947, regiments lost their second battalion, although some were reformed temporarily for the Korean War.

The system introduced during 1881 finally ended with the reforms introduced by the Defence White Paper of 1957. A number of pairs of regiments were amalgamated, while regimental depots were closed with recruiting and training being organised in multi-regiment brigades.

Sources

See also
List of Regiments of Foot
List of British Army regiments (1881)
Cardwell Reforms
Haldane Reforms

References

External links
Transcript of a speech on the reforms given by Hugh Childers in 1882
Original proposals for amalgamations and regimental titles (regiments.org)
 The Highland Regiments 

19th-century history of the British Army
1881 in the United Kingdom
19th-century military history of the United Kingdom
British defence policymaking
1881 in military history
Military reforms
Lists of British Army units and formations